
This is a list of players who graduated from the Challenge Tour in 2008. The top 20 players on the Challenge Tour's money list in 2008 earned their European Tour card for 2009.

* European Tour rookie in 2009
T = Tied 
 The player retained his European Tour card for 2010 (finished inside the top 120).
 The player did not retain his European Tour Tour card for 2010, but retained conditional status (finished between 121-153).
 The player did not retain his European Tour card for 2010 (finished outside the top 153).

Remkes won three Challenge Tour events in 2008.

Winners on the European Tour in 2009

Runners-up on the European Tour in 2009

See also
2008 European Tour Qualifying School graduates

External links
Final ranking for 2008

Challenge Tour
European Tour
Challenge Tour Graduates
Challenge Tour Graduates